Iglesia de Santa María (Villamayor) is a church in Asturias, Spain. It was established in the 10th century and was run initially as a convent.

References

Churches in Asturias
10th-century establishments in the Kingdom of León
10th-century churches in Spain
Bien de Interés Cultural landmarks in Asturias